Kerimova is the feminine form of the surname Kerimov or Karimov. Notable people with the surname include:

 Bakhargul Kerimova, a Turkmenistani writer
 Elnara Kerimova (born 1962), Azerbaijani and Turkish conductor and chorus master
 Flora Kerimova (born 1941), Azerbaijani pop music singer, civil rights activist 
 Gulouchen Kerimova (born 1979), Azerbaijani female volleyball player

See also
Kerimov
Karimov
Karimova